Kaʻula Island, also called Kaʻula Rock, is a small, crescent-shaped island in the Hawaiian Islands.

Mythology
In the legend of Papa and Wākea, Kaula is the seventh-born child.

Geography
The island is the top of a volcanic tuff cone that rests on top of a larger, submerged shield volcano. The ocean has carved large sea cliffs on the sides of the island. There is a large cave on the northwest side of the island called Kahalauaola (Shark Cave).

The United States Census Bureau defines Kaula as Census Tract 411 of Kauai County, Hawaii. Because of erosion, the island is slowly shrinking.

Kaʻula, which he spelled as "Tahoora", was one of the first five islands sighted by Captain James Cook in 1778.

Lighthouse
A lighthouse was completed on the island in 1932 by the United States Lighthouse Service, which became part of the United States Coast Guard in 1939. The lighthouse remained in operation through 1947.

Military use
The island has been used as a bombing range by the United States Navy since at least 1952. Inert ordnance is currently used, although live explosive ordnance has been used in the past. There is a risk of unexploded ordnance on the island. Permission from the U.S. Navy is required to land on the island.  In 1978, over the objection of the U.S. Navy, the state of Hawaii claimed ownership of Kaula and named the island a State Seabird Sanctuary. A final determination of ownership has not yet been made, and the Navy still uses the southeast point of the island as an aerial bombing and strafing
target.

Diving

Kaula is uninhabited, but fishermen and scuba divers frequently visit the island.

See also

 List of volcanoes in the Hawaiian – Emperor seamount chain
 List of islands
 Desert island

Notes

References

External links
Offshore Islet Restoration Committee, Kaula
Kaula Island
Nautical Chart Containing Kaula Island
Kaula Rock Photos Photographs of Kaula Island, May 2008

Niihau
Geography of Kauai County, Hawaii
Hawaiian–Emperor seamount chain
Tuff cones
Uninhabited islands of Hawaii
Volcanoes of Hawaii
Pliocene volcanoes
Neogene Oceania
Cenozoic Hawaii
Islands of Hawaii